A multirotor or multicopter is a rotorcraft with more than two lift-generating rotors.  An advantage of multirotor aircraft is the simpler rotor mechanics required for flight control.  Unlike single- and double-rotor helicopters which use complex variable pitch rotors whose pitch varies as the blade rotates for flight stability and control,  multirotors often use fixed-pitch blades; control of vehicle motion is achieved by varying the relative speed of each rotor to change the thrust and torque produced by each.

Due to their ease of both construction and control, multirotor aircraft are frequently used in radio control aircraft and unmanned aerial vehicle (UAV) (drone) projects in which the names tricopter, quadcopter, hexacopter and octocopter are frequently used to refer to 3-, 4-, 6- and 8-rotor rotorcraft, respectively. There is also the X8 (also called octo-quad) configuration that is similar to the quadracopter design, except that it has eight rotors; the lower of which have a reversed rotation direction.

In order to allow more power and stability at reduced weight, coaxial rotors can be employed, in which each arm has two motors, running in opposite directions which cancels out rotational torque (one facing up and one facing down).

Also possible is the addition of horizontal propellers These types of rotorcraft (which have just 4 vertical propellers) are called quadplanes.

Rotor Configurations
 Coaxial rotors
 Cyclorotor
 Intermeshing rotors
 Tail rotor
 Tandem rotors
 Transverse rotors

Examples
 de Bothezat helicopter - an American four-rotor helicopter that first flew on December 18, 1922.
 Cierva Air Horse - a British three-rotor "heavy lift" helicopter first flying in 1948. Three rotors were used to give a large lift without compromising rotor strength.
 Volocopter designs - a series of German prototype electric multicopters with 18 rotors, the first electric multicopter in the world to achieve crewed flight. The large number of low-cost motors make it economical, quiet and provide redundancy with ability to maintain control with up to four failed motors.

References

Multirotor helicopters